Tom Holm is a professor in the Native American Studies program at the University of Arizona.

Holm is a registered citizen of the Cherokee Nation.  He is also of Muskogee descent.  Holm served in the United States Marines during the Vietnam War.  He holds a Ph.D. in history from the University of Oklahoma.  Besides being part of the University of Arizona's Native American Studies program he was previously a professor of political science at that institution.

Among works by Holm are Strong Hearts, Wounded Souls: The Native American Veterans of the Vietnam War and The Great Confusion in Indian Affairs: Native Americans and Whites in the Progressive Era (Austin: University of Texas Press, 2005).  In 2008 a novel by him entitled Osage Rose was published.

Sources
University of Arizona biography of Holm
Native American authors listing for Holm

University of Arizona faculty
University of Oklahoma alumni
Living people
Year of birth missing (living people)